James Patrick Montagu Burgoyne Winthrop Stopford, 9th Earl of Courtown (also known as Patrick Courtown; born 19 March 1954), styled Viscount Stopford between 1957 and 1975, is an Irish peer and politician. He is one of the 92 hereditary peers elected to remain in the House of Lords after the House of Lords Act 1999 and sits for the Conservatives.

The son of James Stopford, 8th Earl of Courtown and Patricia Winthrop, he has a brother named Jeremy, and three sisters: Elizabeth, Mary and Felicity. He was educated at Eton and at Berkshire College of Agriculture. He later attended the Royal Agricultural College in Cirencester.  He succeeded to the Earldom of Courtown in 1975. In 1985, he married Elisabeth Dunnett, daughter of Ian Rodger Dunnett.

The Earl took his seat in the House of Lords as 8th Baron Saltersford in 1979. In 1995, he was appointed a Lord in Waiting to Her Majesty The Queen, and a Government Whip. He was a government spokesman for the Home Office, Department of Transport and the Scottish Office. In 2013 he was appointed a Conservative party whip. Following the 2015 election, he joined the Government, again as a Lord in Waiting to Her Majesty and as a Government Whip. He was promoted to Deputy Chief Whip and Captain of the Yeomen of the Guard in the May ministry in July 2016.

The Courtown ancestral home, Courtown House, was demolished in the 1960s, but the Earl visited its location in 2010, with members of his family, and unveiled a plaque in memory of his father at the local church.

The Earl's heir apparent is his son James, who is currently styled as Viscount Stopford.

References

Sources

External links

1954 births
Living people
People educated at Eton College
Alumni of the Royal Agricultural University
Conservative Party (UK) Baronesses- and Lords-in-Waiting
James
Earls of Courtown
Hereditary peers elected under the House of Lords Act 1999